The 2015 Mersin Cup was a professional tennis tournament played on clay courts. It was the 4th edition of the tournament which was part of the 2015 ATP Challenger Tour. It took place in Mersin, Turkey between April 13 and 19.

Singles main-draw entrants

Seeds

 1 Rankings are as of April 7, 2015

Other entrants
The following players received wildcards into the singles main draw:
  Anıl Yüksel
  Barış Ergüden
  Efe Yurtacan
  Cem İlkel

The following players received entry into the singles main draw as a special exempt:
  Constant Lestienne

The following players received entry from the qualifying draw:
  Taro Daniel
  Maxime Hamou
  Iñigo Cervantes
  Antonio Veić

The following players received entry as a lucky loser:
  Adam Pavlásek

Champions

Singles

 Kimmer Coppejans def.  Marsel İlhan, 6–2, 6–2

Doubles

 Mate Pavić /  Michael Venus def.  Riccardo Ghedin /  Ramkumar Ramanathan, 5–7, 6–3, [10–4]

References
 Singles Main Draw

External links
Official Website

Mersin Cup
Mersin Cup
2015 in Turkish tennis